Seán Murphy (born 1947 in Carnmore, County Galway) is an Irish former sportsperson. He played hurling with his local club Carnmore and was a member of the Galway senior inter-county team in the 1960s and 1970s.

References

1947 births
Living people
Galway inter-county hurlers
Connacht inter-provincial hurlers
Carnmore hurlers